Fesperman is a surname. Notable people with the surname include:

Dan Fesperman (born 1955), American reporter and author
John T. Fesperman (1925–2001), American conductor, organist, and author

See also
Fetterman (disambiguation)

English-language surnames